Radwell may refer to:

Radwell, Bedfordshire
Radwell, Hertfordshire